Little Salado Creek, originally Arroyita Salado (Little Salt Creek) is a tributary of the San Joaquin River draining eastern slopes of part of the Diablo Range within the Central Valley of California, United States.   The Creek ends before it reaches the San Joaquin River, south of Patterson in Stanislaus County.

Arroyita Salado was a watering place on El Camino Viejo in the San Joaquin Valley and provided water for Rancho Del Puerto.

References

Rivers of Stanislaus County, California
Tributaries of the San Joaquin River
Diablo Range
El Camino Viejo
Rivers of Northern California